The Firearms (Increased Penalties) Act 1971, is a Malaysian laws which enacted to provide increased penalties for the use of firearms in the commission of certain offences and for certain offences relating to firearms, and to make special provision relating to the jurisdiction of courts in respect of offences thereunder and their trial.

Structure
The Firearms (Increased Penalties) Act 1971, in its current form (1 January 2006), consists of 12 sections and 1 schedule (including 5 amendments), without separate Part.
 Section 1: Short title, application, commencement and duration
 Section 2: Interpretation
 Section 3: Penalty for discharging a firearm in the commission of a scheduled offence
 Section 3A: Penalty for accomplices in case of discharge of firearm
 Section 4: Penalty for exhibiting a firearm in the commission of a scheduled offence
 Section 5: Penalty for having firearm in the commission of a scheduled offence
 Section 6: Penalty for exhibiting an imitation firearm in the commission of a scheduled offence
 Section 7: Penalty for trafficking in firearms
 Section 8: Penalty for unlawful possession of firearms
 Section 9: Penalty for consorting with persons carrying arms
 Section 10: Jurisdiction of Sessions Court
 Section 11: Special provisions relating to transmission of a case to, and trial by, the High Court
 Section 12: No bail to be granted in respect of offences under this Act
 Schedule

References

Firearms (Increased Penalties) Act 1971 

1971 in Malaysian law
Malaysian federal legislation